The Desert Pirate is a 1927 American silent Western film directed by James Dugan and starring Tom Tyler, Frankie Darro and Duane Thompson.

Cast
 Tom Tyler as Tom Corrigan 
 Frankie Darro as Jimmy Rand 
 Duane Thompson as Ann Farnham 
 Edward Hearn as Norton 
 Thomas G. Lingham as Shorty Gibbs 
 Vester Pegg as Henchman

References

Bibliography
 George A. Katchmer. Eighty Silent Film Stars: Biographies and Filmographies of the Obscure to the Well Known. McFarland, 1991.

External links
 

1927 films
1927 Western (genre) films
Films directed by James Dugan
American black-and-white films
Film Booking Offices of America films
Silent American Western (genre) films
1920s English-language films
1920s American films